Nils T. Bjørke  (born 9 March 1959) is a Norwegian farmer, organisational leader and politician. A former leader of the Norwegian Agrarian Association, he was elected to the Storting for Hordaland in 2017.

Career
Born in Voss in 1959, Bjørke is running his own farm in Voss. From 2009 to 2014 he chaired the Norwegian Agrarian Association, having led the local chapter Hordaland Bondelag from 2000 to 2006.
 
He was elected representative to the Storting for the period 2017–2021 for the Centre Party, from the constituency of Hordaland. He served as the fourth vice president of the Storting from 2017 to 2021, as well as a member of the Standing Committee on Scrutiny and Constitutional Affairs.

Following the 2021 election, he was appointed second Vice President of the Storting after Eva Kristin Hansen took over as president.

References

1959 births
Living people
People from Voss
Centre Party (Norway) politicians
Members of the Storting
Hordaland politicians